The 2019 Internazionali di Tennis di Manerbio – Trofeo Dimmidisì was a professional tennis tournament played on clay courts. It was the seventeenth edition of the tournament which was part of the 2019 ATP Challenger Tour. It took place in Manerbio, Italy between 5 and 11 August 2019.

Singles main-draw entrants

Seeds

 1 Rankings are as of 29 July 2019.

Other entrants
The following players received wildcards into the singles main draw:
  Gabriele Bosio
  Viktor Galović
  Holger Vitus Nødskov Rune
  Filippo Speziali
  Samuel Vincent Ruggeri

The following players received entry into the singles main draw using protected rankings:
  Nicolás Barrientos
  Íñigo Cervantes

The following players received entry into the singles main draw as using their ITF World Tennis Ranking:
  Francisco Cerúndolo
  Sadio Doumbia
  Tomás Martín Etcheverry
  Ivan Gakhov
  Botic van de Zandschulp

The following players received entry from the qualifying draw:
  Marco Bortolotti
  Fabien Reboul

The following player received entry as a lucky loser:
  Nikola Čačić

Champions

Singles

  Federico Gaio def.  Paolo Lorenzi 6–3, 6–1.

Doubles

  Fabrício Neis /  Fernando Romboli def.  Sadio Doumbia /  Fabien Reboul 6–4, 7–6(7–4).

References

Internazionali di Tennis di Manerbio - Trofeo Dimmidisì
2019
2019 in Italian tennis
August 2019 sports events in Italy